Oprtalj is a village and municipality in Istria, Croatia. Oprtalj is a community in the central northern part of Istria County, situated across the Mirna river valley from the village of Motovun, about 20 km northwest of Pazin.

Gallery

References

External links

 Official site

Municipalities of Croatia
Populated places in Istria County
Italian-speaking territorial units in Croatia